WGEN may refer to:

 WGEN-FM, a radio station (88.9 FM) licensed to serve Monee, Illinois, United States
 WGEN-TV, a television station (channel 8) licensed to serve Key West, Florida, United States
 WGEN-LD, a low-power television station (channel 45) licensed to serve Miami, Florida
 KIIK-FM, a radio station (104.9 FM) licensed to serve DeWitt, Iowa, United States, which held the call sign WGEN-FM from 1980 to 1998